James Richard Tatro is an American actor, comedian, writer and YouTube personality. He is the creator and star of the YouTube channel LifeAccordingToJimmy, which has more than 3.4 million subscribers and over 713 million video views. Tatro writes, produces and directs each of his video sketches with his friend, Christian A. Pierce.

Tatro has appeared in Grown Ups 2, 22 Jump Street, Blue Mountain State: The Rise of Thadland, and Stuber, as well as the music video for the Lil Dicky song "Freaky Friday". He also starred in the first season of the true-crime mockumentary American Vandal, as Dylan Maxwell which garnered him critical acclaim and a Critics Choice Award nomination. Since 2021, Tatro has had a main role as Connor on the ABC sitcom Home Economics.

Early life
Tatro attended Notre Dame High School in Sherman Oaks, California. He started making comical videos with friends in high school, and then continued to do so at the University of Arizona. He dropped out of school his junior year. While at Arizona he was a member of the Pi Kappa Phi fraternity.

Career
Tatro has performed stand-up comedy across the country at comedy clubs and college campuses.

Tatro's career segued into movies in 2013 with a minor role in the Adam Sandler comedy Grown Ups 2. He then appeared opposite Jonah Hill and Channing Tatum in 2014's 22 Jump Street as Rooster. In 2016, he appeared in the film adaptation of Blue Mountain State.

Tatro starred alongside Gary Busey in the Christian Summer Camp comedy, Camp Manna. Tatro's character, Clayton Vance, is described as "the epitome of Christian cool, Clayton Vance is the counselor every kid wants to be. He only loves one thing more than the Lord… himself. Leader of the Righteous Regiment cabin, his alarming charisma and pedigree for 'winning souls' makes him the envy of everyone. But underneath this suave identity lies a lot of insecurity, and he will do anything it takes including lying, cheating, and manipulating Ian into his cabin - to win his fifth consecutive God Games title."

In 2017, Tatro starred in the Netflix Original series American Vandal, a "true-crime satire that explores the aftermath of a costly high school prank that left twenty-seven faculty cars vandalized with phallic images." Tatro plays Dylan Maxwell, a student accused of vandalizing the cars, and focuses on the mystery of proving his innocence. The show satirizes the popular true-crime genre, such as the Netflix series Making a Murderer. Tatro received wide critical praise for his performance and was nominated for various critics awards.

On November 20, 2017, Tatro announced via social media that he joined the cast of Smallfoot, a 3D computer-animated comedy film as the character Thorp. The film was released in September 2018. The project marked Tatro's second collaboration with Channing Tatum, with whom he worked on 22 Jump Street.

In April 2018, Tatro was to star in NBC pilot Bright Futures. The show was later cancelled by NBC and the pilot episode was left unaired.

On November 14, 2018, it was announced that the second season of The Real Bros of Simi Valley, which premiered on Tatro's LifeAccordingToJimmy YouTube channel, would air on Facebook Watch. Tatro stars, executive produces, co-writes, and directs the series.

In December 2020, Home Economics was given a series order. Tatro plays Connor, the wealthy owner of a private equity firm, who moves closer to his two siblings, one of whom is middle class while the other is broke.

LifeAccordingToJimmy
In 2011, Tatro created his YouTube channel, LifeAccordingToJimmy, with his creative partner, Christian Pierce, in which he uploads comedy skits. As of January 2022, the channel has over 3.46 million subscribers. Tatro's videos have had numerous celebrity appearances, including: Angela Kinsey, David Henrie, Alexander Ludwig, Emily Osment, Darin Brooks, Milo Ventimiglia, Riff Raff, Pauly Shore, and Liliana Mumy.

In 2014, his YouTube channel was listed on New Media Rockstars Top 100 Channels, ranked at #92.

Filmography

References

External links

Living people
21st-century American comedians
21st-century American male actors
American male comedians
American male film actors
American male television actors
American male voice actors
American male writers
Notre Dame High School (Sherman Oaks, California) alumni
University of Arizona alumni
American male web series actors
Web series directors
1992 births